Neocitrullamon, also known as amino(diphenylhydantoin) valeric acid is an anticonvulsant.

References

Hydantoins